Wilbur D. Mills Dam is a steel dam and generating facility located on the Arkansas River in Arkansas County and Desha County, Arkansas, United States.

The dam is part of the McClellan–Kerr Arkansas River Navigation System, and is named for Wilbur D. Mills, a member of United States House of Representatives from Arkansas.

Design

History

This circuitous portion of the Arkansas River between the current dam location and the Mississippi River was historically bypassed by river vessels; early steamboats instead followed a network of rivers—known as the Arkansas Post Canal—which flowed north of the lower Arkansas River, and followed a shorter and more direct route to the Mississippi River. When the McClellan–Kerr Arkansas River Navigation System was constructed between 1963 and 1970, the Arkansas Post Canal was significantly improved, while the lower Arkansas River continued to be bypassed by river vessels. For this reason,  the dam was erected with no lock facilities because the waters downstream of the dam were used only by small recreational boats.

The dam was at first called Dam Number 2, and was constructed between 1963 and 1968.

Fourteen of the barges struck the dam while two passed through the dam's open gate bays. Initial repairs cost $141,000, and additional repairs were initiated in 1990.

A hydroelectric power plant was installed at the dam between 1994 and 1999.  Completed at a cost of $189 million, the plant has a generating capacity of 102.6 megawatts.

Recreation area
The Wilbur D. Mills Campground is located on the Arkansas County side of the dam.  The campground has 21 campsites and a boat launch.

See also
List of dams and reservoirs in Arkansas

References

Dams in Arkansas
Dams completed in 1968
Dams on the Arkansas River